The H-II Transfer Vehicle (HTV), also called , is an expendable, automated cargo spacecraft used to resupply the Kibō Japanese Experiment Module (JEM) and the International Space Station (ISS). The Japan Aerospace Exploration Agency (JAXA) has been working on the design since the early 1990s. The first mission, HTV-1, was originally intended to be launched in 2001. It launched at 17:01 UTC on 10 September 2009 on an H-IIB launch vehicle. The name Kounotori was chosen for the HTV by JAXA because "a white stork carries an image of conveying an important thing (a baby, happiness, and other joyful things), therefore, it precisely expresses the HTV's mission to transport essential materials to the ISS". The HTV is very important for resupplying the ISS because after the retirement of the Space Shuttle it is the only vehicle that can transfer new 41.3 in (105 cm) wide International Standard Payload Racks (ISPRs) and dispose old ISPRs that can fit the 51 in (130 cm) wide tunnels between modules in the US Orbital Segment.

Design 

The HTV is comparable in function to the Russian Progress, ESA ATV, commercial Cargo Dragon 1, and Cargo Dragon 2 of SpaceX. Plus the Cygnus spacecraft, all of which bring supplies to the ISS. Like the ATV, the HTV carries more than twice the payload of the Progress, but is launched less than half as often. Unlike Progress spacecraft, Cargo Dragon 2's and ATV's which use the docking ports automatically, HTVs and American Dragon 1 approach the ISS in stages, and once they reach their closest parking orbit to the ISS, crew grapple them using the robotic arm Canadarm2 and berth them to an open berthing port on the Harmony module.

The HTV has an external payload bay which is accessed by the robotic arm after it has been berthed to the ISS. New payloads can be moved directly from the HTV to Kibō'''s exposed facility. Internally, it has eight International Standard Payload Racks (ISPRs) in total which can be unloaded by the crew in a shirt-sleeve environment. After the retirement of NASA's Space Shuttle in 2011, HTVs became the only spacecraft capable of transporting ISPRs to the ISS. The SpaceX Dragon and Northrop Grumman Cygnus can carry resupply cargo bags but not ISPRs.

The intent behind the HTV's modularized design was to use different module configurations to match different mission requirements. However, to reduce the development cost it was decided to fly the mixed PLC/ULC configuration only.

To control the HTV's attitude and perform the orbital maneuvers such as rendezvous and reentry, the craft has four 500-N-class main thrusters and twenty-eight 110-N-class attitude control thrusters. Both use bipropellant, namely monomethylhydrazine (MMH) as fuel and mixed oxides of nitrogen (MON3) as oxidizer. HTV-1, HTV-2, and HTV-4 use Aerojet's 110 N R-1E, Space Shuttle's vernier engine, and the 500 N based on the Apollo spacecraft's R-4D. Later HTVs use 500 N class HBT-5 thrusters and 120 N class HBT-1 thrusters made by Japanese manufacturer IHI Aerospace Co., Ltd. The HTV carries about 2400 kg of propellant in four tanks.

After the unloading process is completed, the HTV is loaded with waste and unberthed. The vehicle then deorbits and is destroyed during reentry, the debris falling into the Pacific Ocean.

 Flights 

Initially seven missions were planned in 2008–2015. With the extension of the ISS project through 2028, three more missions were added, with the tenth flight seeing an improved, cost-reduced version called the HTV-X.

The first vehicle was launched on an H-IIB rocket, a more powerful version of the earlier H-IIA, at 17:01 UTC on 10 September 2009, from Launch Pad 2 of the Yoshinobu Launch Complex at the Tanegashima Space Center.

, a total of nine missions successfully launched — one each year for 2015–2019 (though there was no launch in 2017, pushing back the latest to 2020)  — one fewer total mission than had been planned in August 2013 at the time the fourth HTV mission was underway.

The improved version of the craft HTV-X is planned to be first used for the tenth flight and will perform scheduled ISS resupply duties for 2021-2024 (with a first launch scheduled for February 2022). In addition, JAXA has agreed to provide HTV-X logistic resupply flights to the Gateway mini-space station (launched by either Falcon Heavy or Ariane 6) as part of its Gateway contribution in addition to co-developing a habitation module with the ESA.

 Successor 
 HTV-X 

In May 2015, Japan's Ministry of Education, Culture, Sports, Science and Technology announced a proposal to replace the HTV with an improved, cost-reduced version preliminary called HTV-X.

In December 2015, the plan to develop HTV-X was approved by the Strategic Headquarters for Space Policy of the Cabinet Office, targeting launch in fiscal year 2021 for the flight of HTV-X1 (Technical Demonstration Vehicle) by the H3 rocket. , new ISS plans from NASA's Flight Planning Integration Panel have set the launch of HTV-X1 for February 2022, which is on schedule. In 2022 the debut of the HTV-X spacecraft has been furtherly delayed to January 2024.

The HTV-X has a length of 6.2 m, or 10 m with the unpressurised cargo module fitted. The payload fairing adaptor and payload dispenser have been widened from 1.7 m to 4.4 m to allow the pressurized cargo module to be swapped out for alternate modules, to add increased structural strength, and to accommodate the side hatch.

, an evolutionary version of HTV-X called HTV-XG is being considered for transferring cargo to the Lunar Gateway as part of the Artemis program.

 Former evolutionary proposals 
 HTV-R 
, JAXA was planning to add a return capsule option. In this concept, HTV's pressurized cargo would be replaced by a reentry module capable of returning  cargo from ISS to Earth.

 Lagrange outpost resupply 
, both JAXA and Mitsubishi conducted studies of a next generation HTV as a possible Japanese contribution to the proposed international crewed outpost at Earth-Moon L2. This variant of HTV was to be launched by H-X Heavy and can carry 1800 kg of supplies to EML2. Modifications from the current HTV includes the addition of solar electric paddles and extension of the propellant tank.

 Human-rated variant 
A proposal announced in June 2008, "Preliminary Study for Manned Spacecraft with Escape System and H-IIB Rocket" suggested combining HTV's propulsion module with a human-rated capsule for four people.

 Japanese space station 
A Japanese space station has been proposed to be built up from HTV modules. This method is similar to how the modules in Mir'', as well as many modules of the Russian Orbital Segment of the ISS are based on the TKS cargo vehicle design.

Gallery

See also 

 Cargo spacecraft
 Comparison of space station cargo vehicles
 Cygnus – an American commercial cargo spacecraft that used the communication system developed for HTV
 Fuji - cancelled Japanese crewed spacecraft proposal
 HOPE-X – cancelled cargo spaceplane proposal

References

External links 

 Project overview of H-II Transfer Vehicle. , JAXA
 HTV/H-IIB launch Special site, JAXA
 . JAXA
 H-II Transfer Vehicle -Road to the HTV's launch-, JAXA
 . JAXA
 H-2B rocket and Kounotori 3D model, Asahi Shinbun
 Japan's space freighter in orbit, BBC News

 
Cargo spacecraft
Supply vehicles for the International Space Station
Space program of Japan
Vehicles introduced in 2009